HaDorbanim (lit. The Porcupines) was an Israeli disco, pop, funk and rock band, formed in 1999. The band sang mostly in Hebrew.

The band announced its breakup in September 2009 soon after the release of their third album, "First After The Second".

Final lineup
Guy Mazig (guitar, vocals)
Eyal Mazig (bass guitar, vocals)
Ron Almog (drums)
Ido 'Ziggo' Ofek (guitar, vocals)

Former members
Itay Gluska (lead vocals)  (left in 2008)
Uri Weinstock keyboards (left after the first album)
Yossi Hasson PC (left after the first album)

Discography

Studio albums
 Kobi - 2003
 Levi - 2006
 First After The Second - 2009

External links
 Myspace Website
 Official website

Israeli rock music groups
Israeli pop music groups
Musical groups established in 1999
1999 establishments in Israel